McDowall State School is a state primary school located on the north side of Brisbane, Queensland in the suburb of McDowall. Established in 1975, the McDowall State School caters for students from prep to grade 6.

School uniform

The main McDowall State School colours are red and green and these are reflected in the school uniform. The formal school uniform is a Tartan button-up shirt, which can also be bought as a dress. The school has a red polo sporting shirt, and polo shirts in school house colours are worn for sporting events and on Friday.

Sporting houses

McDowall State School has four sporting houses, named after native Australian plants:
 Acacia
House colour: yellow
 Banksia
House colour: Green
 Grevillea
House colour: Red
 Melaleuca
House colour: blue

See also

List of schools in Queensland

1975 establishments in Australia
Educational institutions established in 1975
Public primary schools in Brisbane